Stützite or stuetzite is a silver telluride mineral with formula: Ag5−xTe3 (with x = 0.24 to 0.36) or Ag7Te4.

It was first described in 1951 from a museum specimen from Sacarimb, Romania. It was named for Austrian mineralogist Xavier Stütz (1747–1806).

It occurs with other sulfide and telluride minerals in hydrothermal ore occurrences. Associated minerals include sylvanite, hessite, altaite, petzite, empressite, native tellurium, native gold, galena, sphalerite, colusite, tennantite and pyrite.

References

Telluride minerals
Silver minerals
Hexagonal minerals
Minerals in space group 191